SIHA is a four-letter acronym that may refer to:

Schweizerischer Eishockeyverband, The Swiss Ice Hockey Association
Scottish Ice Hockey Association
Swedish Ice Hockey Association
Singapore Ice Hockey Association